Allgaiera is a bacterial genus from the family Rhodobacteraceae with one known species (''Allgaiera indica).

References

Rhodobacteraceae
Bacteria genera
Taxa described in 2020
Monotypic bacteria genera